Japanese green woodpecker or Japanese woodpecker (Picus awokera) is a medium-sized woodpecker similar and closely related to the European green woodpecker, but endemic to Japan.

This species reaches about 30 cm in length, with bright green wings and tail, a red or black mustache and crown (as opposed to the black face of the green woodpecker), gray head, neck, and chest, and white underparts with black markings.

The Japanese green woodpecker is divided into at least two subspecies:

 P. a. awokera, the nominate subspecies, found on Honshū
 P. a. horii, native to Kyūshū

The binomial is a reference to the Japanese name of the species, aogera.

References

External links 

 Japanese woodpecker at Avibase

Japanese green woodpecker
Endemic birds of Japan
Japanese green woodpecker